Pramada may refer to:

 Pramanta, a town in northwestern Greece
 Mike Edwards (musician) (1948–2010), English cellist, also known as Swami Deva Pramada or Pramada  
 Exercises with clubs in Indian wrestling, as described in the Malla Purana